Cyndi Howerton is an American politician serving as a member of the Kansas House of Representatives from the 98th district. She was appointed on August 25, 2021.

Career 
Outside of politics, Howerton works as a tax service manager. She was the Republican nominee for the 86th district of the Kansas House of Representatives in 2020, losing to Stephanie Byers. In August 2021, Howerton was appointed to the Kansas House by members of the Sedgwick County Republican Party to fill the seat left vacant after Ron Howard's death.

Personal life 
Howerton is married to Con Howerton, a pastor and veteran of the United States Air Force who served in Gulf War. They have four children.

References 

Living people
Republican Party members of the Kansas House of Representatives
Women state legislators in Kansas
People from Wichita, Kansas
Politicians from Wichita, Kansas
Year of birth missing (living people)